Heghine (Հեղինե) is a personal name of Armenian origin. 

 Kim Kardashian, baptized with the name
 Heghine Rapyan (born 1985), pianist of Armenian origin
 Heghine Grigorian (Armenian: Հեղինե Գրիգորյան, born 1989) or Egine (Armenian: Իջին, Russian: Иджùн) or Ezhine, Armenian-Russian singer and songwriter